Vermont Route 109 (VT 109) is a  state highway in the U.S. state of Vermont. It begins at VT 108 in the town of Cambridge and ends at VT 118 in Belvidere.

Route description
The routes starts at VT 108 going east for a short period, and then turning to the northeast. While going in this direction, the route goes through the town of Waterville. The road then turns to the east and finally ends at a roundabout intersection with VT 118.

Major intersections

References

External links

109